11/12 may refer to:
November 12 (month-day date notation)
December 11 (day-month date notation)